Sophan Sophiaan (April 26, 1944 – May 17, 2008) was an Indonesian film actor and politician. He was a member of the Indonesian Democratic Party of Struggle (PDIP).

Sophiaan was born in the city of Makassar, South Sulawesi, on April 26, 1944. His last appearance was in the 2008 film, Love, opposite his real life wife, Indonesian actress, Widyawati.

Sophiaan was killed in a motorcycle accident in Sragen, Central Java, on May 17, 2008 at the age of 64. He was participating in a motorcycle parade called "The Route of the National Awakening" to commemorate the 100th anniversary of National Awakening Day when the accident occurred.

The parade, which began in Jakarta on April 12, 2008, was to make stops across Java in the cities of Rengas Dengklok, Cirebon, Pekalongan, Semarang, Rembang, Tuban and Surabaya, before ending in Monas, Jakarta, on May 20, 2008. Sophiaan's accident occurred after he joined in the parade.

He was riding his motorcycle when he struck a large hole in Sragen, near the town's border with Ngawi, East Java, at approximately 9:30 A.M. He suffered internal injuries and a broken leg in the accident. Sophiaan died at Sragen Hospital at around 10 A.M. on May 17, 2008.

Former President of Indonesia and chair of the PDIP, Megawati Sukarnoputri, issued a statement expressing condolences after the accident. Sophiaan and Megawati had become colleagues when she founded her PDIP political party.

Filmography

Film

TV series

Director and Scriptwriter

Awards and nominations

References

External links

 ANTARA: Ministers welcome body of late Sophan Sophiaan at airport

1944 births
2008 deaths
Bugis people
People from Makassar
Indonesian male film actors
Indonesian male television actors
Road incident deaths in Indonesia
Motorcycle road incident deaths
Indonesian Democratic Party of Struggle politicians
Indonesian film directors